This is a list of banks in Ethiopia.

Ethiopian Black Market foreign currency exchange -> https://www.ethioblackmarket.com[edit] 
The rate of exchange was at some point, as high as two-fold from the rate of exchange in the banks. 1 $US was fetching as high as 120 Ethiopian Birr ( to get the latest Ethiopian black market exchange rate check out https://www.ethioblackmarket.com ). In the Banks, it was selling for under 53 birr.

People in Ethiopia have been using the black market foreign currency services as another means to get access to foreign currency. In an effort to reverse what has now become a prevalent foreign currency black market ( something that is leading to the loss of considerable revenue to the government in addition to aggravating inflation), the National Bank of Ethiopia has introduced a series of regulatory measures.

The amount of cash holdings for individuals (outside of the bank) is now 100,000 Ethiopian birr and it is 200,000 for businesses.  With that, the National Bank is introducing financial incentives to those who inform designated law enforcement whenever there are excess holdings and foreign currency holdings. The anonymous informants could get up to 15 percent of the seized cash value once the court ruled that the holding is illegal. Apart from foreign currency, the government is cracking down on what it calls illegal trade in gold and the acquisition of it in unauthorized quantities. The government is also imposing restrictions on importing certain goods – whose absence would not cause harm domestically.  It is considering reactivating procedures whereby importers under the Franco-Valuta arrangement will produce documents to verify the source of their foreign currency holdings. It was practiced in the bank in the past and was deactivated in what is said to be an effort to minimize red tape for members of the business communities.Why is the government reintroducing the system? Because the government says there are business people engaged in buying foreign currency from the black market and taking the money out of the country under the guise of Franco-Valuta business activity.

External links
Website of the National Bank of Ethiopia

See also

List of banks in Africa
National Bank of Ethiopia

References

 
Banks
Ethiopia
Ethiopia